A Little Girl in a Big City is a 1925 silent film drama directed by Burton L. King and starring Gladys Walton. It is based on an off-Broadway play, A Little Girl in a Big City, by James Kyrle MacCurdy. It was Gladys Walton's final film.

Several copies are preserved in positive and negative formats in the Library of Congress archive. A DVD of the film was released by Grapevine Video in 2012.

Cast
 Gladys Walton – Mary Barry
 Niles Welch – Jack McGuire
 Mary Thurman – Mrs. Howard Young
 J. Barney Sherry – Howard Young
 Coit Albertson – D. V. Cortelyou
 Helen Shipman – Rose McGuire
 Sally Crute – Mrs. Barry
 Nellie Savage – Dolly Griffith

References

External links
 
 
 dvd of the film

1925 films
American silent feature films
American films based on plays
Films directed by Burton L. King
1925 drama films
American black-and-white films
Silent American drama films
Gotham Pictures films
1920s American films